Josette is a feminine given name. It may also refer to:

 Josette (1937 film), a French film
 Josette (1938 film), an American film